Deh Gorji (also Romanized as Deh Gorjī) is a village in Oshnavieh-ye Jonubi Rural District, Nalus District, Oshnavieh County, West Azerbaijan Province, Iran. At the 2006 census, its population was 522, in 94 families.

References 

Populated places in Oshnavieh County